Eslamabad (also Romanized as Eslāmābād) is a village in Rigestan Rural District, Zavareh District, Ardestan County, Isfahan Province, Iran. At the 2006 census, its population was 234, in 58 families.

References 

Populated places in Ardestan County